Edward Joseph Perkins (June 8, 1928 – November 7, 2020) was an American career diplomat who served as U.S. Ambassador to Liberia, South Africa, the United Nations, and Australia. He also served as the director of the United States State Department's Diplomatic Corps.

Early life and education
Perkins was born in Sterlington, Louisiana. He grew up in Haynesville, Louisiana, on a farm belonging to his grandparents, Nathan and Sarah Stovall Noble. His grandmother regarded learning and academic success as the key to her grandson’s future, and pushed him away from succeeding his grandfather on the farm and towards higher education and study. As a result, Perkins eventually moved - first to Pine Bluff, Arkansas, and then to Portland, Oregon, and graduated there in 1947 from Jefferson High School. It was during this period that he began to consider his dream of becoming a diplomat, after attending a local international relations club meeting at which several consuls general spoke. He earned his B.A. from the University of Maryland, College Park in 1967, and his M.A. and Doctor of Public Administration from the University of Southern California. He was an active member of Kappa Alpha Psi fraternity.

Career
Enthusiastic about seeing the wider world beyond the United States, Perkins enlisted in the United States Army, serving for three years. A return to civilian life would prove temporary; he again enlisted, this time in the United States Marine Corps, and served for four years in Japan, Hawaii, and South Korea. This period saw Perkins become interested in the study of Eastern philosophy.

Foreign Service 
Perkins passed the Foreign Service exam in 1971. Through a satellite campus of the University of Southern California, he would later earn his master’s degree in 1972 and a doctorate in 1978, both of which were in public administration.

Concerned with the lack of support for fellow black members of the Foreign Service, Perkins became a founding member of the Thursday Luncheon Group with John W.H. Gravely, a weekly support and advocacy group for black officers. The organization has since grown to a membership of over 300. Perkins also organized members to visit the Congressional Black Caucus and advocate for recruitment programs aimed at minorities, a move which resulted in the creation of Thomas R. Pickering Foreign Affairs Fellowship.

Ambassador appointments 
Perkins was appointed ambassador to Liberia in 1985, less than a year after Samuel Doe took control of the country. He described his role as "[insuring] the safety of the numerous Americans in Liberia..." and to "help restore the country to order and rebuild the infrastructure."

Perkins was then appointed ambassador to South Africa in 1986 by President Ronald Reagan. From the beginning, this position would prove to be a challenge – the naming of the black ambassador to the post was seen as a concession by Reagan to ward off sanctions by the United States Congress. Several Black civil rights leaders approached Perkins, advising against accepting the appointment, including the Rev. Jesse Jackson. Perkins, however, decided to accept the appointment regardless, citing his oath of office to 'go where needed', and believing he "might be able to do something in South Africa." During his appointment tenure, Perkins focused on improving communication between blacks, whites, and other ethnic groups in the country, holding integrated receptions, attending church services, and visiting South African towns and villages. He overcame South African black activists’ initial hostility towards him through “carefully chosen shots” at the South African regime that demonstrated solidarity with the country’s victims of apartheid, including attendance at the Delmas Treason Trial.

Director General of the Foreign Service 
Perkins left the post in 1989, to accept the position of Director General of the Foreign Service. During his tenure as the first African-American director general, Perkins instituted policies of recruitment aimed at diversifying the ranks of its officers. Perkins described the ranks of the organization at the time of his hiring as “an exclusive club: overwhelmingly white, male and Ivy-League-educated…”. Efforts at hiring people of color, women, and people from Appalachia were intensified, and it was during this time that the organization recruited its first blind officer, Avraham Rabby.

Subsequent appointments 
He continued to serve in the State Department until 1992, when he was appointed United States Ambassador to the United Nations and U.S. Representative to the United Nations Security Council. In 1993, he was appointed representative to the Commonwealth of Australia, where he served until 1996 before retiring at the rank of Career Minister in the United States Foreign Service.

He taught at the University of Oklahoma where he served as Senior Vice Provost Emeritus of International Programs at the International Program Center, and Professor Emeritus of the School of International and Area Studies. He was a member of the American Academy of Diplomacy.

In 2006, Perkins’ memoir, Mr. Ambassador, Warrior for Peace, was published by the University of Oklahoma Press.

In 2007, Perkins moved to Washington, DC. On September 3, 2009, his wife, Lucy Cheng-Mei Liu, died.

Perkins died on November 7, 2020 after a stroke.

Personal life 
After he was discharged from the Marine Corps, Perkins took a civilian job with the Army and Air Forces Exchange Services in Taiwan. It was during this time that he met his future wife, Lucy Ching-mei Liu. Liu’s traditional Taiwanese family did not want her to marry a black American, necessitating an elopement between the two in Taipei in 1962. They had two children, Katherine and Sarah Perkins, and four grandchildren.

Writings
 Mr. Ambassador, Warrior for Peace (memoirs,) published by The University of Oklahoma Press in 2006.
 The Palestinian Refugees: Old Problems - New Solutions (Studies in peace politics in the Middle East) - co-editor with Joseph Ginat, Sussex Academic Press, 2002.
 The Middle East Peace Process: Vision Versus Reality (Studies in peace politics in the Middle East) - co-editor with Joseph Ginat, Sussex Academic Press, 2002.
 Palestinian Refugees: Traditional Positions and New Solutions = co-editor with Joseph Ginat, University of Oklahoma Press, 2001.
 The seedlings of hope: U.S. policy in Africa, U.S. Department of State, 1989.

References

Directors General of the Foreign Service/Directors of the Bureau of Human Resources
Representatives of the U.S.A. to the United Nations
 Edward J. Perkins
 biography and citations
University of Maryland University College / Achiever Summer 2007 article
Norma M. Riccucci (1995). Unsung Heroes: Federal Execucrats Making a Difference. Georgetown University Press.]

External links

The Legacy of Ambassador Edward J. Perkins: Reflections on Families in the Diplomatic Service, National Museum of American Diplomacy

|-

|-

|-

|-

1928 births
2020 deaths
African-American diplomats
Ambassadors of the United States to Australia
Ambassadors of the United States to Liberia
Ambassadors of the United States to South Africa
Florida State University faculty
Jefferson High School (Portland, Oregon) alumni
Military personnel from Louisiana
People from Ouachita Parish, Louisiana
Writers from Portland, Oregon
Writers from Louisiana
Writers from Oklahoma
Permanent Representatives of the United States to the United Nations
University of Maryland Global Campus alumni
University of Oklahoma faculty
USC Sol Price School of Public Policy alumni
African Americans in Oregon
United States Foreign Service personnel
African-American history of Oregon
Directors General of the United States Foreign Service
American expatriates in Japan
American expatriates in South Korea
20th-century African-American people
20th-century American diplomats
21st-century African-American people